Wanda Nanibush (born 1976) is an Anishinaabe curator, artist and educator based in Toronto, Ontario. She is the Curator of Indigenous Art at the Art Gallery of Ontario and the author of the 2017 book Violence No More: The Rise of Indigenous Women.

Career
Nanibush is a member of the Beausoleil First Nation. She obtained an MA in visual arts from the University of Toronto. She has also served as Curator in Residence at the Justina M. Barnicke Gallery.

Nanibush has a long-standing relationship with Anishinaabe multimedia artist Rebecca Belmore and has curated a series of shows featuring her work including KWE: Photography, Sculpture, Video and Performance by Rebecca Belmore (2014) at the Justina M. Barnicke Gallery, and Rebecca Belmore: Facing the Monumental (2018) a retrospective of Belmore's 30 year career at the Art Gallery of Ontario.

Nanibush has been an active community organizer participating in demonstrations against the Iraq War and uranium processing, and raising awareness about the relationship between racism and lack of education. She has also worked as an organizer for Idle No More Toronto talks and teach-ins to help with education efforts.

Art Gallery of Ontario
Nanibush began work at the Art Gallery of Ontario in 2016 as an assistant curator of Canadian and Indigenous Art in the department of Canadian art. Her first curatorial project at the AGO was assisting with Toronto: Tributes + Tributaries, 1971–1989, for which she included Anishinaabemowin interpretive text alongside English and French as a way of marking Toronto as traditional Indigenous territory.

When the AGO restructured in 2017, renaming the department of Canadian Art to the department of Indigenous and Canadian Art, Nanibush was promoted to curator of Indigenous Art. As part of the role, Nanibush co heads the department with Georgiana Uhlyarik, the curator of Canadian Art. Together they have made a series of changes to the exhibition of Indigenous and Canadian art ranging from the renaming the 1929 Emily Carr painting from The Indian Church to Church in Yuquot Village, 73 years after Carr's death, and positioning Anishinaabe as the first available text on display in the J.S. McLean Center for Indigenous and Canadian Art, followed by English and French, as a way of recognizing Indigenous peoples as the first occupiers of what is now Canada.

Since becoming the curator of Indigenous Art, Nanibush's influence has led to Indigenous artists representing nearly one third of those featured at the AGO. In a 2018 profile about the changes underway at the Gallery and other institutions featuring Indigenous art, the New York Times noted Nanibush as "one of the most powerful voices for Indigenous culture in the North American art world."

Wanda Nanibush’s goal as curator of Canadian and Indigenous art is to tell the story of the Indigenous people who have for years seen their cultures oppressed and their sacred land destroyed by colonialism. She pursues her goals through her work as curator of art she feels helps portray the stories of natives’ resilience and treatment throughout the years. Rebecca Belmore is one of the many artists Nanibush holds curatorial projects with and her art helps reflect a message Nanibush hopes to spread. Belmore’s diverse art forms aim to “address such issues as the stereotyping of native people, the commoditization of Native bodies for souvenir items, and the violence against Native Women” (Beard). Robert Kautuk is a photographer that captures the livelihood and connection of the Indigenous people to nature in the hopes of preserving it. Nanibush continues to work alongside other artists or their estates such as Shelley Niro, the late Rita Letendre, Meryl McMaster, and many more who all contribute their experiences and perspectives of Indigenous peoples lives that have remained unknown or less than well-known for years.

Curated Exhibitions
Rebecca Belmore: Facing the Monumental, organized and circulated by the Art Gallery of Ontario (2018), toured to the Remai Modern (2019) and the Musée d'art contemporain de Montréal (2019)
Sovereign Acts II, Leonard & Bina Ellen Art Gallery at Concordia University (2017), toured to the University of Waterloo Art Gallery (2018)
The Fifth World, Mendel Art Gallery (2015) and toured to the Kitchener-Waterloo Art Gallery (2016)
KWE: Photography, Sculpture, Video and Performance by Rebecca Belmore, Justina M. Barnicke Gallery (2014)

Publications

References

1976 births
Living people
First Nations artists
Canadian art curators
Canadian women curators
Indigenous curators of the Americas
University of Toronto alumni